The contrabass clarinet (also pedal clarinet, after the pedals of pipe organs) and contra-alto clarinet are the two largest members of the clarinet family that are in common usage. Modern contrabass clarinets are transposing instruments pitched in B♭, sounding two octaves lower than the common B♭ soprano clarinet and one octave below the bass clarinet. Some contrabass clarinet models have extra keys to extend the range down to low written E♭, D or C. This gives a tessitura written range, notated in treble clef, of C – F, which sounds B♭ – E♭. Some early instruments were pitched in C; Arnold Schoenberg's Fünf Orchesterstücke specifies a contrabass clarinet in A, but there is no evidence such an instrument has ever existed.

The smaller E♭ contra-alto clarinet is sometimes referred to as the "E♭ contrabass clarinet" and is pitched one octave lower than the E♭ alto clarinet.

Two models of subcontrabass clarinet (the octocontralto and octocontrabass), lower in pitch than the B♭ contrabass, were built as prototypes by Leblanc in the 1930s and survive only as museum items.

History

Contrabass
The earliest known contrabass clarinet was the contre-basse guerrière invented in 1808 by a goldsmith named Dumas of Sommières; little else is known of this instrument.  The batyphone (also spelled bathyphone, Ger. and Fr. batyphon) was a contrabass clarinet which was the outcome of W. F. Wieprecht's endeavor to obtain a contrabass for the reed instruments. The batyphone was made to a scale twice the size of the clarinet in C, the divisions of the chromatic scale being arranged according to acoustic principles. For convenience in stopping holes too far apart to be covered by the fingers, crank or swivel keys were used. The instrument was constructed of maple-wood, had a clarinet mouthpiece of suitable size connected by means of a cylindrical brass crook with the upper part of the tube and a brass bell. The pitch was two octaves below the clarinet in C, the compass being the same, and thus corresponding to the modern bass tuba. The tone was pleasant and full, but not powerful enough for the contrabass register in a military band. The batyphone had besides one serious disadvantage: it could be played with facility only in its nearly related keys, G and F major. The batyphone was invented and patented in 1839 by F.W. Wieprecht, director general of all the Prussian military bands, and E. Skorra, the court instrument manufacturer of Berlin. In practice the instrument was found to be of little use, and was superseded by the bass tuba.

A batyphone bearing the name of its inventors formed part of the Snoeck collection which was acquired for Berlin's collection of ancient musical instruments at the Hochschule für Musik.  Soon after Wieprecht's invention, Adolphe Sax created his clarinette-bourdon in B.

In 1889, Fontaine-Besson began producing a new pedal clarinet (see photograph).
The tube is doubled up twice upon itself. 
There are 13 keys and 2 rings on the tube, and the fingering is the same as for the B clarinet except for the eight highest semitones. 
The tone is rich and full except for the lowest notes, which are unavoidably a little rough in quality, but much more sonorous than the corresponding notes on the contrabassoon. 
This is an octave lower than a bass clarinet and two octaves lower than a B♭ clarinet
The upper register resembles the chalumeau register of the B clarinet, being reedy and sweet.
None of these instruments saw widespread use, but they provided a basis for contrabass clarinets made beginning in the late 19th and early 20th centuries by several manufacturers, notably those designed by Charles Houvenaghel for Leblanc, which were more successful.

Contra-alto

The contra-alto clarinet is higher-pitched than the contrabass and is pitched in the key of E rather than B. The unhyphenated form "contra alto clarinet" is also sometimes used, as is "contralto clarinet", but the latter is confusing since the instrument's range is much lower than the contralto vocal range; the more correct term "contra-alto" is meant to convey, by analogy with "contrabass", that the instrument plays an octave lower than the alto clarinet. It is also referred to as the E contrabass clarinet. It is the second-largest member of the clarinet family in regular use, larger than the more common bass clarinet but not as large as the B contrabass clarinet.

Like other clarinets, the contra-alto clarinet is a wind instrument that uses a reed to produce sound.  The keys of the contra-alto are similar to the keys on smaller clarinets, and are played in the same way.  Some contra-alto clarinet models have a range extending down to low (written) E, sounding as the lowest G on the piano (aka G1), while others can play down to low (written) C, sounding E1.

The earliest contra-alto clarinets were developed in the first half of the nineteenth century; these were usually pitched in F and were called contrabasset horns, being an octave lower than the basset horn.  Albert (probably E. J. Albert, son of Eugène Albert) built an instrument in F around 1890.  In the late 19th and early 20th century contra-alto clarinets in E finally attained some degree of popularity.

The contra-alto clarinet is used mostly in concert bands and clarinet choirs, where it usually, though not always, plays the bass line of a piece of music.  While there are few parts written specifically for it, the contra-alto can play the baritone saxophone part and sounds the same pitch; it is also possible to read parts written in the bass clef for instruments pitched in C (such as bassoon or tuba) as if the part were in the treble clef, while adjusting the key signature and any accidentals as necessary by adding three sharps to the music.   It is occasionally used in jazz, and a few solo pieces have been written for it.  The contra-alto clarinet is also used in a few Broadway pit orchestras, with its parts being written in reed books as a doubled instrument (e.g. with soprano clarinet and bass clarinet). The contra-alto clarinet can also be used in marching bands where it shares the parts of the sousaphone or baritone saxophone. However, because of its size and weight, many bands choose not to march them in parades.

Subcontrabass

It was exhibited at the World's Fair that year. It is the only known specimen of this size of clarinet, and its lowest note, C (written D), is the lowest note on a 32′ pedal organ stop. This instrument survives in non-playable condition in the Leblanc musical instrument museum,  in La Couture-Boussey, France.

Leblanc also built two slightly smaller prototype octocontralto clarinets in E♭ in the 1930s, pitched a fifth below the B♭ contrabass and one octave below the E♭ contra-alto clarinet. Only one was ever finished with key work, in 1971 to low C (sounding E♭). This instrument was restored to playable condition in 2011 by Cyrille Mercadier, and is also on permanent exhibit in the Leblanc museum.

Although these enormous "octo" clarinets are mentioned in some texts (e.g. Baines, 1991) neither were manufactured beyond the prototype stage. There are some contemporary attempts to recreate the octocontrabass clarinet, using modern plastics and 3D printing technology. At least three pieces of music have been written specifically for octocontrabass by Norwegian composer Terje Lerstad (Trisonata, Op. 28; De Profundis, Op. 139; and Mirrors in Ebony for clarinet choir, Op. 144). There are no known recordings of these pieces, or indeed even of the instrument itself.

Manufacturers
France:
 Henri Selmer Paris
 Contrabass (Model 41- pictured in the info box above) to low C in bass clarinet-shape with rosewood body.
 Contra-alto (Model 40) to low E♭ in bass clarinet-shape with rosewood body.
 Buffet Crampon makes a contra-alto clarinet, grenadilla body in bass clarinet-shape, pictured in the info box above. 

USA: 
 Conn-Selmer has one model of each of the two clarinets under its brand Leblanc.
 Contrabass: Leblanc L7182, to low E-flat, ABS body.
 Contra-alto: Leblanc L7181, to low E-flat, ABS body.
Germany:
 Benedikt Eppelsheim still produces the already presented metal contrabass clarinet with Boehm or German system.
 Fritz Wurlitzer contrabass clarinet with German system
Italy: 
 Ripa Musical Instruments distributes a double bass clarinet made of metal in paperclip form.

China: 
 Tianjin Frater Musical Instrument Co. produces a double bass clarinet made of metal in paperclip form.

Performers
Probably the best-known musician who has made significant use of the contrabass clarinet as a solo instrument is Anthony Braxton. Other performers (most of whom use the instrument in the genres of jazz and free improvised music) include James Carter, Brian Landrus, Douglas Ewart, Vinny Golia, Mwata Bowden, Ernst Ulrich Deuker, Paolo Ravaglia, Hamiet Bluiett, Edward "Kidd" Jordan, and Jason Alder. Leroi Moore of the Dave Matthews Band played a contrabass clarinet on the song "So Right" from the 2001 album Everyday and John Linnell of They Might Be Giants utilizes the contra-alto clarinet on their 2013 album Nanobots, as well as subsequent releases by the band. Colin Stetson makes use of the instrument on his 2015 collaboration album Never Were the Way She Was with violinist Sarah Neufeld.

Performers in composed classical music: 

Harry Sparnaay (NL), Ernesto Molinari (CH), Armand Angster (F), Theo Nabicht (D), 

Fie Schouten (NL), Sarah Watts (UK), Jason Alder (UK), Heinz-Peter Linshalm (AT), 

Marco Antonio Mazzini (PE), Andrea Nagy (HU/D).

References

Sources

External links
Contrabass clarinet page at contrabass.com.
Photos and audio example of a Leblanc paper clip model instrument.

Contrabass instruments
Clarinets
B-flat instruments